is a railway station in Nagai, Yamagata, Japan, operated by the Yamagata Railway.

Lines
Ayame-Kōen Station is a station on the Flower Nagai Line, and is located 19.1 rail kilometers from the terminus of the line at Akayu Station.

Station layout
Ayame-Kōen Station has a single side platform serving traffic in both directions.

Adjacent stations

History
Ayame-Kōen Station opened on 9 June 2002.

Surrounding area
 Ayame-Kōen
 Yamagata prefectural Nagai technical high school

External links
  Flower Nagai Line 

Railway stations in Yamagata Prefecture
Yamagata Railway Flower Nagai Line
Railway stations in Japan opened in 2002